Deborah Baker is an American biographer and essayist.

She is the author of A Blue Hand: The Beats in India, a biography of Allen Ginsberg that focuses on his time in India and of In Extremis: The Life of Laura Riding, a finalist for the Pulitzer Prize in biography in 1994. She also writes for the Los Angeles Times. Her book The Convert: A Tale of Exile and Extremism (2011) is a biography of Maryam Jameelah (born Margaret Marcus), a Jewish woman from New York who converted to Islam.  
In 2012, she wrote a critical review for The Wall Street Journal of Defender of the Realm, the Manchester-Reid biography of Winston Churchill.

Family
She is married to the writer Amitav Ghosh and lives in Brooklyn, Calcutta, and Goa.

Awards
Baker was awarded a Guggenheim Fellowship in 2014.

In 2016, she was awarded a Whiting Creative Nonfiction Grant to complete her book, The Last Englishmen: Love, War and the End of Empire.

Works
Making a Farm: The Life of Robert Bly; Charlottesville, Va., 1981. 
In Extremis: The Life of Laura Riding; New York : Grove Weidenfeld, 1992. , 
A Blue Hand: The Beats in India; New York : Penguin Press, 2008. , 
The Convert: A Tale of Exile and Extremism. Saint Paul, Minn. : Graywolf, 2013. , 
The Last Englishmen, Graywolf Press, Minneapolis, Minnesota : Graywolf Press, 2018. ,

References

External links
Official website

Living people
Year of birth missing (living people)
American biographers
American essayists
American women biographers
American women essayists
21st-century American women
Loomis Chaffee School alumni